The 1850s (pronounced "eighteen-fifties") was a decade of the Gregorian calendar that began on January 1, 1850, and ended on December 31, 1859.

It was a very turbulent decade, as wars such as the Crimean War, shifted and shook European politics, as well as the expansion of colonization towards the Far East, which also sparked conflicts like the Second Opium War. In the meantime, the United States saw its peak on mass migration to the American West, that particularly made the nation experience an economic boom, as well as a rapidly increasing population.

Wars 

 Crimean War (1854–56) fought between Imperial Russia and an alliance consisting of the United Kingdom of Great Britain and Ireland, the Second French Empire, the Kingdom of Sardinia and the Ottoman Empire. The majority of the conflict takes place around Crimea, on the northern coasts of the Black Sea.
 On 8 October 1856 the Second Opium War between several western powers and China begins with the Arrow Incident on the Pearl River.
 Second War of Italian Independence (1859), also known as Franco-Austrian War, or Austro-Sardinian War.

Internal conflicts 
 The Alexandrian Revolt, by Alexandrian locals led by Sherekoh governor of Alexandria against Abbas I of Egypt.
 The Indian Mutiny, a revolt against British colonial rule in India.
 Bleeding Kansas (1854–59): battles erupt in Kansas Territory between proslavery and "Free-State" settlers, directly precipitating the American Civil War.
 Reform War (1857–61) in Mexico
 Taiping Rebellion (1851–64) in Southeastern China.
 Nian Rebellion (1853–68) in Northern China.
 Miao Rebellion (1854–73) in Guizhou Province, China.
 Red Turban Rebellion (1854–1856) in Guangdong Province, China.
 Punti-Hakka Clan Wars (1855–67) in Guangdong Province, China.
 Panthay Rebellion (1856–73) in Yunnan Province, China.

Prominent political events 

 Moldavia and Wallachia are unified and form Romania.
 Gideon T. Stewart attempts to create a Prohibition Party.
 Dissolution of the Mughal Empire by the British.
 Establishment of the South African Republic (Zuid-Afrikaansche Republiek) and the Orange Free State, granting independence to the Voortrekkers by the British.

Assassinations and attempts

Prominent assassinations, targeted killings, and assassination attempts include:
 Assassination of Abbas I of Egypt by 4 of his slaves (1854)
 Eight were killed and 142 wounded in Paris in a failed assassination attempt on Napoleon III, Emperor of the French (1858).

Science and technology
 The Great Exhibition is held at the Crystal Palace in 1851, considered to be the first world's fair.
 Charles Darwin publishes The Origin of Species, putting forward the theory of evolution by natural selection in November 1859.
 Epidemiology begins when John Snow traces the source of an outbreak of cholera in London to a contaminated water pump.
 Discovery of Neanderthal fossils in Neanderthal, Germany.
 Solar flares discovered by Richard Christopher Carrington.
 University of Sydney established in 1850.

Economics 
 Distinction between coats and jackets begins to blur
 Production of steel revolutionized by invention of the Bessemer process
 Benjamin Silliman fractionates petroleum by distillation for the first time
 First transpacific telegraph cable laid
 First safety elevator installed by Elisha Otis
 Railroads begin to supplant canals in the United States as a primary means of transporting goods.
 First commercially successful sewing machine made by Isaac Singer

Environment 
 Ukrainian settlers bring Carniolan honeybees to the Primorsky Krai

Society 
 The word girlfriend first appears in writing in 1855.
 The word boyfriend first appears in writing in 1856.

Popular culture

Literature
 Charles Dickens publishes Bleak House, Hard Times, Little Dorrit and A Tale of Two Cities
Nathaniel Hawthorne publishes The Scarlet Letter in 1850
Herman Melville publishes Bartleby, the Scrivener in 1853
Charlotte Brontë publishes Villette in 1853
Elizabeth Gaskell publishes North and South in 1854

External links 
 American texts from the 1850s
 American speeches from the 1850s